Haut-Lieu is a commune in the Nord department in northern France.

See also
Communes of the Nord department

References

Hautlieu